Ogyginus is an extinct genus of asaphid trilobites that lived during the Ordovician period. Commonly found in Wales. The type specimen was first described by Murchison in 1839 as Asaphus corndensis, though the species was later reassigned.

References

 Trilobite info (Sam Gon III)

External links

Asaphidae
Asaphida genera
Ordovician trilobites of Europe
Fezouata Formation fossils

Ordovician genus extinctions